The Free Japan movement dates back to February 1944, when a report from Yenan announced the arrival of Susumu Okano, a member of the Japanese Communist Party. A Free Japan Committee, officially named the Japanese People's Liberation Alliance, was active in Yenan.

In November 7, 1944, John K. Emmerson proposed the use of a "free Japan" movement in the war against Japan.

See also
Japanese dissidence during the Shōwa period

References

External links

 

 
Japan in World War II
Japanese Communist Party
World War II resistance movements